Whiteinch Riverside railway station served the Whiteinch area of the city of Glasgow. It was a two platform station on the Lanarkshire and Dunbartonshire Railway.

Passenger services

The station was located in an elevated position and was served by Caledonian Railway passenger trains from Glasgow (Central) via Partick Central and onwards to Dumbarton railway station and Balloch. From January 1923, the service was operated by the London Midland & Scottish Railway.

Routes

References

Notes

Sources
 
 
 

Beeching closures in Scotland
Disused railway stations in Glasgow
Railway stations in Great Britain opened in 1896
Railway stations in Great Britain closed in 1964
Former Caledonian Railway stations